Zafra M. Lerman is an American chemist, educator, and humanitarian. She is the President of the Malta Conferences Foundation, which aims to promote peace by bringing together scientists from otherwise hostile countries to discuss science and foster international scientific and technical collaboration. From 1986 to 2010, she chaired the American Chemical Society's Subcommittee on Scientific Freedom and Human Rights. She has been successful in preventing executions, releasing prisoners of conscience from jail and bringing dissidents to freedom. She is the recipient of many awards for education and science diplomacy, including the 1999 Presidential Award from U.S. President Clinton, the 2005 Nyholm Prize for Education from the Royal Society of Chemistry (England), the 2015 Science Diplomacy Award from the American Association for the Advancement of Science (AAAS), the 2016 Andrei Sakharov Award for human rights from the American Physical Society (APS), the 2016 United Nations NOVUS Award for the 16th Sustainable Development Goal: Peace and Justice, and the 2017 International Union of Pure and Applied Chemistry Distinguished Women in Chemistry or Chemical Engineering Award.

Early career
Lerman received a Ph.D. in Chemistry from the Weizmann Institute of Science in Rehovot, Israel. She conducted research on isotope effects at the Weizmann Institute of Science, Cornell University and Northwestern University in the US, and the ETH Zurich, Switzerland.

Science education and the arts

Lerman used the arts to help teach science at all levels. In 1977, she became the first science faculty member at Columbia College Chicago, an institution of higher education specializing in arts and media disciplines. In 1981, she founded the Department of Science and Mathematics there and served as department Chair through 1991. In 1991, she founded the Institute for Science Education and Science Communication (also known as the 'Science Institute") at Columbia College and served as its head until 2009. Since 1991 she was a Distinguished Professor of Science and Public Policy.

Part of her teaching philosophy is captured in this quote, from a 2011 lecture entitled "Creativity in 3D: "Drawing, Dance, and Drama":
"Students remember and understand abstract concepts best by producing their own artistic projects and using their own (sometimes hidden) creativity. Through this process, students are active learners, and utilize both their left and right brain, instead of being just passive observers."

Peace activism
  In addition to developing innovative methods of teaching science through the arts, Lerman started using science to promote peace and human rights around the globe. In 1986 she was named Chair of the American Chemical Society's Subcommittee on Scientific Freedom and Human Rights. Among other activities, this group's mission included helping scientists who, for political reasons, were jailed, abused, and sentenced to execution. She held that position for 25 years.

Starting in 2001, Lerman began working to develop a scientific conference that would bring together researchers from many different, often mutually hostile, nations in the Middle East so they could cooperatively work toward solving problems facing the region. With support from the American Chemical Society (ACS), International Union of Pure and Applied Chemistry (IUPAC), the Royal Society of Chemistry (RSC - England), and the Gesellschaft Deutscher Chemiker, the first conference was held on the island of Malta from December 6 to 11, 2003. Attendees included six Nobel Laureates and scientists from 15 Middle Eastern Countries (Bahrain, Egypt, Iran, Iraq, Israel, Jordan, Kuwait, Lebanon, Libya, Palestinian Authority, Qatar, Saudi Arabia, Syria, Turkey, and United Arab Emirates). The conference included workshops to foster cross-border collaborations on air and water quality, science education for all, and green energy.

The organizers followed up by hosting a second meeting two years later, Malta II.

The meeting was honored by United States Senator Dick Durbin in a speech on the floor of the U.S. Senate entitled "Chemists Working Cooperatively".

Lerman led the initiative to continue with the conferences and founded the Malta Conferences Foundation to support them. She secured the support of UNESCO, the United Nations Educational, Scientific, and Cultural Organization.

List of Malta Conferences

Notable awards and honors

Selected publications

References

Living people
21st-century American chemists
American educators
American humanitarians
American women chemists
American chemists
Women educators
Women humanitarians
1937 births
21st-century American women scientists